Frank Kell Cahoon (June 20, 1934 – January 30, 2013) was an American politician who served in the Texas House of Representatives from 1965 to 1969.

Cahoon was born in Austin, Texas and grew up in Wichita Falls, Texas. Cahoon went to Colorado School of Mines and  University of Texas at Austin. Cahoon served in the United States Army. He was involved in the oil business in Midland, Texas. Cahoon served on the Midland City Council. He was the state's only Republican state legislator in 1965.

He was named after his maternal grandfather, Frank Kell.

References

External links

|-

1934 births
2013 deaths
People from Austin, Texas
People from Midland, Texas
Military personnel from Texas
Republican Party members of the Texas House of Representatives
Texas city council members
American businesspeople in the oil industry
Wichita Falls High School alumni
Colorado School of Mines alumni
University of Texas at Austin alumni